Counterpunch can refer to:
 Counterpunch (boxing), a punch in boxing
 CounterPunch, a political magazine
 Counterpunch (typography), a type of punch used in traditional typography
 Punch/Counterpunch, a fictional character in The Transformers
 Counterpuncher, a tennis strategy
 Wade Hixton's Counter Punch, a boxing game for the Game Boy Advance
 Operation Counterpunch, a military offensive during the Laotian Civil War
 CounterPunch (film), a Netflix Original documentary directed by Jay Bulger